Cochylis bucera is a species of moth of the family Tortricidae. It is found in North America, where it has been recorded from Illinois, Indiana, Massachusetts, Michigan, New Mexico, Ontario and Pennsylvania.

The wingspan is about 8 mm. Adults are on wing from June to September.

References

Moths described in 1997
Cochylis